The Kerala Sangeetha Nataka Akademi Fellowship is an honour presented by the Kerala Sangeetha Nataka Akademi, an autonomous organisation for the encouragement, preservation, and documentation of the performing arts of Kerala, set up by the Department of Cultural Affairs of the Government of Kerala. Instituted in 1972, the fellowships are given to outstanding artistes who have contributed to the performing arts in the state. The awardees are decided after a general body meeting conducted by the Akademi panel members and are presented by the Governor of Kerala.

From 2012, the fellows are known by the title "Kalarathna", which is also applied to the previous winners. The recipients will receive a statuette, a citation, and cash prize. The reward comprised 15,000 until 2012, it was raised to 25,000 from the next year onward.

List of fellows

See also 
 Sangeet Natak Akademi Fellowship

References

External links 
 

Arts of Kerala
Kerala Sangeetha Nataka Akademi
Fellowships
Indian art awards
Lists of members of learned societies
Awards established in 1972
1972 establishments in Kerala